Territorial Assembly elections were held in Gabon on 31 March 1957. Although the Gabonese Democratic and Social Union (UDSG) won 14 of the 40 contested seats, the Gabonese Democratic Bloc was able to form a 21-seat coalition with the Entente–Defence of Gabonese Interests (a list headed by BDG member Paul Yembit) and five other MPs.

Results

References

Gabon
1957 in Gabon
Elections in Gabon